Beek-Elsloo railway station is located between the villages of Elsloo and Beek, in the Dutch municipality of Beek. The station opened in 1862 on the Maastricht–Venlo railway.

Train services
The following train services by Arriva call at this station:
 Local stoptrein S2: Roermond–Sittard–Maastricht Randwyck

References

External links
NS website

Railway stations in Limburg (Netherlands)
Railway stations opened in 1862
Railway stations on the Staatslijn E
Beek
1862 establishments in the Netherlands
Railway stations in the Netherlands opened in the 19th century